The 1982 Cronulla-Sutherland Sharks season was the sixteenth in the club's history. Coached by Greg Pierce and captained by Steve Rogers and Dane Sorensen, they competed in the NSWRFL's 1982 Winfield Cup premiership, finishing the regular season 8th (out of 14) and failing to reach the finals. The Eels also competed in the 1982 KB Cup.

Rogers was Parramatta's only player selected for representative football, playing for New South Wales in the 1982 State of Origin series and for Australia on the 1982 Kangaroo tour of Great Britain and France.

Ladder

References

Cronulla-Sutherland Sharks seasons
Cronulla-Sutherland Sharks season